Hutton & Co. was a  sickle, scythe and tool smiths based in Ridgeway, Derbyshire, England. The company was founded by The Hutton family in 1760 and operated out of a number of locations around the village. The most notable workshop was located at High Lane and was known as the Phoenix Works. During the 19th century, much of the grinding was done on the Nether Wheel.  The company exported tools around the world, and its main competitors were the nearby Thomas Staniforth & Co.

The business ceased operations in 1988.

References

Garden tool manufacturers
Tool manufacturing companies of the United Kingdom
Horticultural companies of the United Kingdom
Companies based in Derbyshire
1760 establishments in England